Khusainovo (Xösäyen) is a rural locality (a village) in Shigayevsky Selsoviet, Beloretsky District, Bashkortostan, Russia. The population was 238 as of 2010. There are 3 streets.

Geography 
Khusainovo is located 36 km southwest of Beloretsk (the district's administrative centre) by road. Uzyanbash is the nearest rural locality.

References 

Rural localities in Beloretsky District